Lachele Carl  is an American actress based in England. She is best known for playing the recurring character of news anchor Trinity Wells in Doctor Who, appearing in the episodes "Aliens of London"/"World War Three", "The Christmas Invasion", "The Sound of Drums", "The Poison Sky", "Turn Left", "The Stolen Earth" and "The End of Time". Wells also appeared in the Doctor Who spin-offs The Sarah Jane Adventures (in the stories Revenge of the Slitheen and Secrets of the Stars) and Torchwood, during its five-part serial Children of Earth, making her the first character to appear in all three programmes. To this date, Carl is one of just four actors to have appeared in all three shows, the others being Anthony Daebeck (who plays a French newsreader), Julian Bleach and Paul Marc Davis.

Carl also narrated the behind-the-scenes special Doctor Who: The Companions for BBC America, released as part of the seventh series DVD box set.

Carl has also appeared in Grange Hill, Batman and Alien Autopsy. She plays one of the voices in The Notekins and was the first voice of Muck and Molly in the American English dub of the children's TV series Bob the Builder. Carl played a minor role as the US Ambassador in the British TV show Ambassadors.

Personal life
Carl lives in Crouch End, North London with her husband, composer Alejandro Viñao, and their son.

Filmography

References

External links
 

Living people
American television actresses
American film actresses
American voice actresses
American emigrants to England
American expatriate actresses in the United Kingdom
American expatriates in England
Year of birth missing (living people)
Place of birth missing (living people)